Peter Kjær (born 5 November 1965) is a Danish former professional footballer, current television commentator, and former sporting director of Silkeborg IF. During his active career as a goalkeeper, he played the bulk of his career with Danish clubs Vejle Boldklub and Silkeborg IF. He played for Turkish club Beşiktaş before ending his career with Aberdeen in Scotland, retiring in 2003. He represented the Denmark national team in four matches.

Biography
Born in Fredericia, he started his senior career at Vejle BK in 1983. He played a total 225 games and scored two goals for the club. He only played one game in the 1991–92 Danish Superliga season, serving as back-up for Boye Habekost, as Vejle were relegated to the Danish 1st Division. He played his last Vejle game in November 1992, before he joined Superliga club Silkeborg IF, making his debut for the team in March 1993. He played a total 291 games and scored two goals for Silkeborg, won the 1993–94 Danish Superliga championship and the 2001 Danish Cup with the team, and was named 1999 Danish Goalkeeper of the Year.

He had a brief stint in Turkey with Beşiktaş in 2001, under manager Christoph Daum. After two months at the club, Kjær was told by Daum that he contemplated leaving the club, and Kjær asked for his contract to be annulled. In October 2001, he was picked up by Danish manager Ebbe Skovdahl to join Scottish club Aberdeen. He stayed with the club until June 2003, after which he retired.

Kjær was included in the Denmark squads for the 1995 Intercontinental Cup, 1998 FIFA World Cup, Euro 2000 but he spent all three tournaments on the bench. He made his Denmark debut on 25 April 2001 in the farewell match of Peter Schmeichel. He was 35 years and 171 days old at the time, breaking the old record for oldest Danish debutant by 17 days, a record set by Johannes Gandil in 1908. He went on to play four international games until March 2002. He was included in the Danish squad for the 2002 FIFA World Cup, serving as a back-up to Thomas Sørensen.

After his retirement, Kjær was hired as a commentator and pundit for Danish TV 3 in August 2004. He was named sporting director of his former club Silkeborg IF in October 2008, and was in the job for nearly six months. He then went back to doing TV work.

References

External links
Danish national team profile
Vejle Boldklub profile
Soccerbase – Scottish statistics
Danish Superliga statistics
 Peter Kjaer Interview
 Fredericianske Peter Kjær: It hurt to stop the career

1965 births
Living people
People from Fredericia
Danish men's footballers
Association football goalkeepers
Denmark international footballers
Denmark under-21 international footballers
Danish Superliga players
Süper Lig players
Scottish Premier League players
Vejle Boldklub players
Silkeborg IF players
Aberdeen F.C. players
Beşiktaş J.K. footballers
1995 King Fahd Cup players
1998 FIFA World Cup players
UEFA Euro 2000 players
2002 FIFA World Cup players
FIFA Confederations Cup-winning players
Danish television presenters
Danish expatriate men's footballers
Danish expatriate sportspeople in Scotland
Expatriate footballers in Scotland
Danish expatriate sportspeople in Turkey
Expatriate footballers in Turkey
Sportspeople from the Region of Southern Denmark